David Nitschmann der Syndikus (David Nitschmann the Syndic; September 20, 1703 in Zauchtenthal/Suchdol nad Odrou – March 28, 1779 in Zeist) was a Czech-born Moravian missionary.

He went to the East Indies and served briefly as a missionary in Sri Lanka. He was forced to leave because of political difficulties.

He became a leading member of the executive boards of the Herrnhuter or Moravian Brethren and often led negotiations with governments, hence his title "Syndicus".

His son was Christian David Nitschmann.

Notes and references

External links

1703 births
1779 deaths
Moravian Church missionaries
Protestant missionaries in Sri Lanka
Czech Protestant missionaries
Czech people of the Moravian Church